Fake Tattoos is a Canadian drama film, directed by Pascal Plante and released in 2017. The film stars Anthony Therrien as Theo, a young loner who meets and falls in love with Mag (Rose-Marie Perreault) at a rock concert.

Awards
Perreault received a Prix Iris nomination for Revelation of the Year at the 20th Quebec Cinema Awards in 2018, and a Canadian Screen Award nomination for Best Actress at the 7th Canadian Screen Awards in 2019.

The film was shortlisted for the Prix collégial du cinéma québécois in 2019.

References

External links
 
 
 Fake Tattoos (version in French with English subtitles) at Library and Archives Canada

2017 films
2017 drama films
Canadian drama films
Films directed by Pascal Plante
French-language Canadian films
2010s Canadian films